A substantive title is a title of nobility or royalty acquired either by individual grant or inheritance. It is to be distinguished from a title shared among cadets, borne as a courtesy title by a peer's relatives, or acquired through marriage.

Characteristics 
 The title is officially borne by only one person at a time:
 e.g. British peerages or "William, Prince of Wales" vs. "Princes George and Louis of Wales".
 The title may continue to be borne by the grantee, with authorization of the head of the house, whether the country is a monarchy or a republic.
 The title may be drawn from any rank, but a royal titleholder's precedence derives independently from kinship to the sovereign (e.g. royal duke); "Duke" is frequent, but lower titles have often been borne by dynasts and pretenders.
 The title may or may not belong to the noble hierarchy of the country if borne by a member of its ruling dynasty, e.g., the Prince of Orange, modern title of the heir to the Dutch throne, although Orange has never been part of the Netherlands. 
 The title may or may not belong to the hereditary nobility of the recipient's country (e.g. Duke of York, Prince of Wales), may or may not be heritable (e.g. Duke of Aosta, Duke of Bergamo), and is often conferred in conjunction with a special occasion.

Current monarchies 
The main titles of heirs apparent to a monarchy are treated as substantive titles.
  – Duke of Brabant
  – Marquis of Baux (must be conferred and may be conferred on a male heir presumptive)
  – Prince of Orange
  – Prince of Asturias (used by the heir apparent or heir presumptive)
  – Prince of Girona (used by the heir apparent or heir presumptive)
  – Prince of Viana (used by the heir apparent or heir presumptive)
  – Prince of Wales (must be conferred by monarch)
  – Duke of Cornwall (restricted to eldest son of monarch)
  – Duke of Rothesay (restricted to eldest son of monarch)

Of European dynasties, Liechtenstein, Luxembourg, and Norway do not grant substantive titles to family members.

Granted titles 
In countries where titles have been inherited by primogeniture, these are substantive titles (e.g. France, Portugal, Spain, the United Kingdom, and the titles of sovereigns in Europe post-1800). These may be contrasted with titles inherited by all sons or male-line descendants of the original grantee (Austria, Bohemia, Germany except Prussia, Hungary, Poland, Russia and some titles in Belgium, Italy, the Netherlands and Scandinavia). 

Although official, titles shared by members of a dynasty are non-substantive, the Almanach de Gotha historically recording them as prefixes to the given name, whereas substantive titles usually followed the titleholder's given name. Substantive titles are often granted to royalty in honour of an important dynastic occasion: with the baptism of a new dynast, coming of age, or an approved wedding. Recent examples include  Prince Harry, Duke of Sussex. The Almanach de Gotha treated similarly titles used by dynasties of abolished monarchies: the head of the house bearing a traditional title of the dynasty in lieu of or after the given name (e.g. Duarte Pio, Duke of Braganza), while cadets shared a princely title as prefix in addition to any suffixed substantive title accorded them as individuals by the head of the house (e.g. Infante Miguel, Duke of Viseu and Prince Aimone, Duke of Apulia).

Titles of former ruling houses

In accordance with a tradition dating back to the reign of Napoleon I, titles in pretence were treated by the Almanach de Gotha as if still borne by members of reigning dynasties, with the exception that titles exclusively borne by monarchs (e.g. Emperor, King, Queen, Grand Duke (Grossherzog)), their consorts, and heirs (Crown Prince, Hereditary Prince) were restricted to the last dynast who held the title during the monarchy and borne for the duration of their lifetimes.
 
The spouse of a monarch, heir apparent or titleholder may or may not share usage of the substantive title, but when this is the case the spouse holds the title derivatively (e.g., Carlos Zurita, Duke of Soria). In European monarchies, the dynastic wife of a male monarch shares her husband's rank and bears the female equivalent of his title (i.e., Empress, Queen, Grand Duchess, Duchess or Princess). The husband of a female monarch, however, does not acquire the crown matrimonial automatically. Only in Monaco has the male equivalent (Prince) of the dynast's title been conferred upon the husband of an heiress presumptive since the nineteenth century. In the medieval era, the husband of a female sovereign in Europe usually took the title, rank and authority of his wife jure uxoris. Later, the husbands of queens regnant were usually, but not automatically, elevated to the wife's ruling status, sometimes as co-King and sometimes as King consort (e.g. John III of Navarre, Philip II of Spain, Francis II of France, Henry, Lord Darnley (later Duke of Rothesay, etc.), William III, Pedro III of Portugal, Ferdinand II of Portugal, Francis II of Spain), etc.

See also
 Cadet (genealogy)
 Ennoblement
 Hereditary peer
 Imperial, royal and noble ranks
 Jure uxoris
 Peerages in the United Kingdom
 Subsidiary title
 Territorial designation

References

Titles
European royalty